Pijetlović is a Serbian surname. Notable people with the surname include:

 Duško Pijetlović (born 1985), Serbian water polo player 
 Gojko Pijetlović (born 1983), Serbian water polo player

Serbian surnames